The Trade Union Reform and Employment Rights Act 1993 (c 19) was a UK labour law that abolished the minimum wages set by sectors through 27 remaining wage councils. It also recast parts of the Employment Protection (Consolidation) Act 1978 and altered the Trade Union and Labour Relations (Consolidation) Act 1992. Most parts were then transferred to the Employment Rights Act 1996.

Overview
ss 43 and 44 narrowed the powers of ACAS, removing power to intervene in collective bargaining by giving advice, and stressing its new "advisory" role, making its services not free of charge, stipulating that ACAS's chairman need not be full-time, and introducing "compromise agreements"

See also
UK labour law

Notes

Career development in the United Kingdom
Trade union legislation
United Kingdom labour law
United Kingdom Acts of Parliament 1993
1993 in labor relations